Palais de Sports de Beaublanc is an indoor sporting arena that is located in Limoges, France. The seating capacity of the arena for basketball games is 6,500.

History
The arena opened in the summer of 1981. It was used as one of the host arenas for the FIBA EuroBasket 1983. It has been used as the long-time home arena of the French Pro A League professional basketball club, Limoges CSP.

References

External links
Official Site 
Palais des Sports de Beaublanc Interior Image

Basketball venues in France
Buildings and structures in Limoges
Indoor arenas in France
Sports venues in Haute-Vienne
Sports venues completed in 1981